Dichomeris fida is a moth in the family Gelechiidae. It was described by Edward Meyrick in 1923. It is found in Pará, Brazil.

The forewings are fuscous. The stigmata is black, the plical beneath the first discal. There is a cloudy pale ochreous dot on the costa at three-fourths and minute marginal dots around the costa posteriorly and the termen. The hindwings are grey.

References

Moths described in 1923
fida